A quorum is the minimum number of members of a deliberative assembly (a body that uses parliamentary procedure, such as a legislature) necessary to conduct the business of that group. According to Robert's Rules of Order Newly Revised, the "requirement for a quorum is protection against totally unrepresentative action in the name of the body by an unduly small number of persons." In contrast, a plenum is a meeting of the full (or rarely nearly full) body. A body, or a meeting or vote of it, is quorate if a quorum is present (or casts valid votes).

The term quorum is from a Middle English wording of the commission formerly issued to justices of the peace, derived from Latin quorum, "of whom", genitive plural of qui, "who". As a result, quora as plural of quorum is not a valid Latin formation. In modern times a quorum might be defined as the minimum number of voters needed for a valid election.

In Robert's Rules of Order

According to Robert, each assembly determines the number of members that constitutes a quorum in its governing documents (such as in its constitution, charter, bylaws or standing orders). The quorum may also be set by law. Robert's Rules of Order Newly Revised states that the quorum set in an organization's bylaws "should approximate the largest number that can be depended on to attend any meeting except in very bad weather or other extremely unfavorable conditions."

In the absence of such a provision, a quorum is an assembly whose membership can be determined is a majority of the entire membership. In the meetings of a convention, unless provided otherwise, a quorum is a majority of registered delegates, even if some have departed. In a mass meeting or in an organization in which the membership cannot be accurately determined, the quorum consists of those who attend the meeting.

In committees and boards, a quorum is a majority of the members of the board or committee unless provided otherwise. The board or committee cannot set its own quorum unless given such power. In a committee of the whole or its variants, a quorum is the same as the assembly unless otherwise provided.

In online groups, a quorum has to be determined in a different manner since no one is actually "present".  The rules establishing such groups would have to prescribe this determination. An example is that a quorum in such groups could be established as "present" if enough members state that they are "present" at the designated meeting time.

Determination of a quorum
The chairperson of the group has the responsibility to determine if a quorum is present. In addition, any member can raise a point of order about an apparent absence of a quorum. Because it is difficult to determine exactly when a quorum was lost, points of order relating to the absence of a quorum are "generally not permitted to affect prior action; but upon clear and convincing proof, such a point of order can be given effect retrospectively by a ruling of the presiding officer, subject to appeal."

Limited actions in the absence of a quorum
When a quorum is not met, the assembly can only take limited procedural actions. These limited actions are to fix the time to which to adjourn, adjourn, recess, or take measures to obtain a quorum, such as a motion that absent members be contacted during a recess.

Any other business that is conducted is not valid unless it is ratified at a later meeting where a quorum is present. However, there is no obligation to ratify such action and those responsible may be punished for their actions.

Call of the house
In legislatures and other assemblies that have the legal power to compel the attendance of their members, the call of the house procedure may be used to obtain a quorum. This procedure does not exist in ordinary societies, since voluntary associations have no coercive power.

When a call of the house is ordered, the clerk calls the roll of members and then the names of absentees. Members who do not have an excused absence are arrested and brought in. The arrested members may be charged a fee.

Both chambers of the United States Congress have the power to compel the attendance of absent members; this procedure, authorized by Article I, Section 5 of the U.S. Constitution is rarely used in the modern Congress.

By country

Australia
While Section 22 and section 39 of the Constitution of Australia set the quorum for sittings of the House of Representatives and Senate at one-third of the whole number of MPs and senators, respectively, Parliament is permitted to change the quorum for each House by ordinary legislation.

In the House of Representatives, the quorum was amended down to one-fifth by the House of Representatives (Quorum) Act 1989, which means the quorum of the current House of 151 MPs is 31 MPs. In the senate, the quorum was amended down to one-quarter by the Senate (Quorum) Act 1991, so 19 senators is a quorum. The quorum includes the occupant of the Chair, and is not reduced by the death or resignation of a member or senator.

If at the beginning of a sitting the quorum is not met, the bells are rung for five minutes and a count is then taken; if the quorum is still not met the sitting is adjourned until the next sitting day. During the sitting, any MP or senator may draw attention to the lack of quorum in which the bells are rung for four minutes, and if a quorum is still not met the sitting is adjourned.

Although quorum-busting is virtually unheard of in Australia, it is not unknown for parties to deliberately use quorum counts as a disruptive tactic and there have been some suggestions to enact rules to restrict this practice; however, this is very difficult due to the explicit mention of a quorum in the constitution. It is considered disorderly to call attention to quorum when one exists, and members or senators who do so can be punished.

Austria 
In the National Council of Austria at least one-third of the representatives must be present, so that they may decide on a simple law (participation quorum of 33.3%). At least half of the members must participate if a constitutional law should pass the parliament (participation quorum of 50% based on the total number of members). Over and above that, constitutional laws require the consent of at least two-thirds of the members present (quorum agreement of 66.6% based on the number of voting present).

Canada
In Canada, the Constitution Act, 1867 sets quorum for sittings of the House of Commons of Canada at 20 MPs. If a member calls for quorum to be counted and a first count shows there are fewer than 20 members, bells are rung to call in the members; if after 15 minutes there are still fewer than 20 members, the session is adjourned to the next sitting day; the members present sign a roll on the table of the house, and this list is included in the Journal of the House. There is no need for quorum when the attendance of the House is requested in the Senate of Canada, for example, when royal assent is being given to bills. The quorum of the Senate is 15.

Provincial and territorial quorums

Germany 
In the German Bundestag at least half of the members (355 out of 709) must be present so that it is empowered to make resolutions. It is however common that fewer members are present, because they can still make effective decisions as long as no parliamentary group or 5% of the members of the parliament are complaining about the lack of quorum. This, in rare cases, is used by opposition parties to delay votes.

Hong Kong 
Article 75 of the Basic Law of Hong Kong stipulates that the quorum required for the meetings of the Legislative Council of Hong Kong (LegCo) as "not less than one-half of its members". Between 1997 and 2012 the quorum was 30, and since 2012 it has been 35. Prior to 1997 transfer of sovereignty over Hong Kong, the quorum was set at 20.

The quorum for the panels, committees and subcommittees is, nevertheless, one-third or three members, whichever the greater, as according to the Rules of Procedure. The three standing committees, namely, the Finance Committee, the Public Accounts Committee and Committee on Members' Interests, is exceptional that the quorums are 9, 3 and 3 respectively.

Quorum-busting was used at least twice since 1997. In 2005, when some pro-democracy members of the council paid a silent tribute to late leader of the People's Republic of China, Zhao Ziyang, against the Rules of Procedure, the president of the council suspended the meeting. When the meeting was recalled, pro-Beijing members refused to return to the chamber, forcing the meeting to be adjourned.

On 27 January 2010, when five pro-democracy members were intending to make their resignation speeches, pro-Beijing members of the council left the chamber as a sign of protest. One of the pro-Beijing members nevertheless stayed in the chamber to call for the quorum to be counted, effectively forcing the meeting to be adjourned. The resignation was intended as a de facto referendum across all five geographical constituencies of the territory, involving the entire electorate, which would not be officially recognised anyway. Most other factions, although against the move by these five Members, stayed in the chamber.

On 2 May 2012, when the LegCo was debating a law change to bar resigning legislators to participate in by-elections in 6 months, effectively discouraging any more "de facto" referendums, some of the five pro-democracy members who resigned constantly issued quorum calls, especially when they were making their resignation speeches intended for 2 years before. In the nine-hour meeting, 23 quorum calls were issued, taking up to 3 hours. When LegCo reconvened on 3 May, it was adjourned for lack of quorum amid a boycott by the pan-democrats. The pro-government members drew a timetable to ensure a quorum, but it failed to prevent another lack of quorum.

On 18 June 2015, when the LegCo was due to vote on a resolution to amend the provisions for the election of the territory's Chief Executive, pro-Beijing members left the chamber to force a quorum roll call to make sure that a sick member could be able to rush back to the chamber. However some of the members stayed behind, citing miscommunication, and the division proceeded with two members above the required quorum of 35. While the resolution was originally predicted to be narrowly defeated due to not able to get super-majority support votes, it turned out to be a landslide defeat.

Quorum-busting and attempts to thwart it are also a common feature during the annual motion debate related to the 1989 Tiananmen massacre moved by pro-democracy Members. The quorum is called to be counted from time to time by the pan-democrats, in order to force the pro-Beijing camp to keep some members in the chamber.

India 

Article 100 of the Constitution of India stipulates that at least 10% of total number of members of the House must be present to constitute the quorum to constitute a meeting of either House of Parliament. For example, if the House has the total membership of 250, at least 25 members must be present for the House to proceedings with its business.

If at any time during a meeting of a House there is no quorum, the Chairman has to either adjourn the House or suspend it until there is a quorum.

Ireland 
According to the most recent standing orders, published in 2011, the quorum for the Oireachtas, the Irish parliament, for both the lower House, Dáil Éireann, and the upper House, Seanad Éireann, is 20 members.

The chamber of Dáil Éireann is rarely full outside question time, with often just one government representative (often an ordinary Teachta Dála, not a minister) present to answer opposition questions.

Italy 
Article 64 of the Italian Constitution prescribes that the quorum for both houses of Parliament is an absolute majority of their membership. A quorum is assumed to be present unless 20 or 7 members in the Chamber of Deputies and in the Senate respectively request for its presence to be verified.

Pakistan
Article 55  of the constitutions of Pakistan states that, if at any time during a sitting of the National Assembly the attention of the person presiding is drawn to the fact that less than one-fourth of the total membership of the Assembly is present, he shall either adjourn the Assembly or suspend the meeting until at least one-fourth of such membership is present, which comprises 87 out of total 342.

Philippines
In Congress of the Philippines, half of the membership (13 in the Senate and 153 in the House of Representatives) is needed to muster a quorum. If someone contests the lack of quorum, a roll call shall be done, and if there is indeed less than a majority of members present, the meeting shall be adjourned.

Both majority and minority blocs in Congress have used the lack of quorum in defeating bills that they don't want to be passed without putting it to a vote. After an election during the lame-duck session, quorums are notoriously difficult to muster, more so in the House of Representatives as winning incumbents may opt to go on vacation, and defeated incumbents may opt to not to show up.

Turkey

According to article 96 of the Turkish Constitution, unless otherwise stipulated in the Constitution, the Turkish Grand National Assembly shall convene with at least, one-third of the total number of members (184 out of 550) and shall take decisions by an absolute majority of those present; however, the quorum for decisions can, under no circumstances, be less than a quarter plus one of the total
number of members (138 out of 550).

Before the constitutional referendum of 2007, there was a quorum of two-thirds required in the Turkish Parliament: after opposition parties used the quorum to deadlock the presidential election of 2007, making it impossible for the parliament to choose a president, the ruling AK party proposed a referendum to lower the quorum to prevent a repeat of this event. Nearly seventy percent of the participants supported the constitutional changes.

United Kingdom
In the Parliament of the United Kingdom, the House of Commons has a quorum of 40 MPs, including the Speaker, out of 650 members of the House. There is no need for a quorum to be present at all times: Commons debates could theoretically continue even if only one MP and the Speaker were present.

However, if a division is called and fewer than 40 MPs are present, then a decision on the business being considered is postponed and the House moves on to consider the next item of business.

The quorum for votes on legislation in the House of Lords is 30, but just three of the 753 peers, including the Lord Speaker, are required to be present for a debate to take place.

Historically, the quorum was a select group of the justices of the peace in each county in early modern Britain. In theory, they were men experienced in law, but many of the quorum were appointed because of their status. Some legislation required the involvement of a member of the quorum (e.g., granting a license to a badger). In practice, they increasingly were not qualified, as the proportion in the quorum rose faster than the proportion who were called to the bar or practising lawyers. By 1532, an average 45% of justices of the peace nationally were of the quorum. In Somerset, the proportion rose from 52% in 1562 to 93% in 1636. By then, most of those not on the quorum were new to the bench. Sometimes justices of the peace were removed from the quorum as a disciplinary measure less drastic than removal from the bench.

United Nations
The large deliberative bodies of the United Nations (the General Assembly and Economic and Social Council, as well as their subsidiary organs) generally require the attendance of one-third of the membership (currently 65 states in the General Assembly and 18 in ECOSOC) to conduct most business, but a majority of members (currently 97 states in the General Assembly and 28 states in ECOSOC) in order to take any substantive decisions. The rules of the United Nations Security Council make no provisions for quorum, but nine votes are in all cases required to pass any substantive measure, effectively meaning that a meeting with fewer than nine members in attendance is pointless.

United States
Article I, Section 5, Clause 1 of the United States Constitution provides that "Each House shall be the Judge of the Elections, Returns and Qualifications of its own Members, and a Majority of each shall constitute a Quorum to do Business..."

Therefore, in both the House of Representatives and the Senate, a quorum is a simple majority of their respective members (currently 218 in the House and 51 in the Senate).

The only exceptions are those stated in the Twelfth Amendment:
 In cases where no candidate for President of the United States receives a majority in the Electoral College, the election is decided by the House of Representatives, in which case "a quorum for this purpose shall consist of a member or members from two-thirds of the states" (a possible quorum as low as 34).
 In cases in which no candidate for Vice President of the United States receives a majority in the Electoral College, the election is decided by the Senate, in which case "a quorum for the purpose shall consist of two-thirds of the whole number of Senators" (a quorum of 67).

The Senate has the additional ordinary requirement in Rule VI of its Standing Rules that "A quorum shall consist of a majority of the Senators duly chosen and sworn."

Call of the house in the United States Senate 
In the United States Senate, the procedure was last used in the early morning hours of 25 February 1988.

Senator Robert C. Byrd of West Virginia, then the Senate Majority Leader, moved a call of the house after the minority Republicans walked out of the chamber in an attempt to deny the Senate a quorum after Senate aides began bringing cots into the Senate cloakrooms in preparation for an all-night session over campaign finance reform for congressional elections.

Byrd's motion was approved 45-3 and arrest warrants were signed for all 46 Republicans: Senate Sergeant-at-Arms Henry K. Giugni and his staff searched the Capitol's corridor and Senate office buildings for absent Senators, and after checking several empty offices, spotted Senator Steve Symms of Idaho, who fled down a hallway and escaped arrest. After a cleaning woman gave a tip that Senator Robert Packwood of Oregon was in his office, Giugni opened the door with a skeleton key. Packwood attempted to shove the door closed, but Giugni and two assistants pushed it open. Packwood was subsequently carried feet-first into the Senate chamber by three plainclothes officers and sustained bruised knuckles.
 
Prior to 1988, the last time the procedure had been used was during a 1942 filibuster over civil rights legislation: Southern Democrat senators had spent days filibustering legislation to end poll taxes, days after the midterm elections had resulted in the Democrats losing of nine seats. Democratic Majority Leader Alben W. Barkley obtained an order on a Saturday session on 14 November 1942, directing Sergeant at Arms Chesley W. Jurney to detain the five Southern absentees to obtain a quorum. Jurney sent his Deputy Sergeant at Arms, J. Mark Trice, to the apartment of Democratic Senator Kenneth McKellar of Tennessee at the Mayflower Hotel. Then 73 years old and the third-most senior Senator, McKellar was later described by Republican Senator Bill Frist in his book on Tennessee senators as an "extraordinarily shrewd man of husky dimensions with a long memory and a short fuse." Trice called from the lobby, but McKellar refused to answer his phone, so the deputy sergeant-at-arms walked up to the apartment and convinced the senator's maid to let him in:

Quorum-busting
Quorum-busting, also known as a walkout, is a tactic that prevents a legislative body from attaining a quorum, and can be used by a minority group seeking to block the adoption of some measure they oppose. This generally only happens where the quorum is a super-majority, as quorums of a majority or less of the membership mean that the support of a majority of members is always sufficient for the quorum (as well as for passage). Rules to discourage quorum-busting have been adopted by legislative bodies, such as the call of the house, outlined above.

Quorum-busting has been used for centuries. For instance, during his time in the Illinois Legislature, Abraham Lincoln leapt out of a first story window (the doors of the Capitol had been locked to prevent legislators from fleeing) in a failed attempt to prevent a quorum from being present.

Recent prominent examples

Texas (2003)
During the 2003 Texas redistricting, the majority Republicans in the Texas House of Representatives sought to carry out a controversial mid-decade congressional redistricting bill which would have favored Republicans by displacing five Democratic U.S. Representatives from Texas, nicknamed the "Texas Five", from their districts. The House Democrats, certain of defeat if a quorum were present, took a plane to the neighboring state of Oklahoma to prevent a quorum from being present (and thus the passage of the bill). The group gained the nickname the "Killer Ds".

Similarly, the minority Democrats in the Texas Legislature's upper chamber, the Texas Senate, fled to New Mexico to prevent a quorum of the Senate to prevent a redistricting bill from being considered during a special session. The group, nicknamed the "Texas Eleven", stayed in New Mexico for 46 days before John Whitmire returned to Texas, creating a quorum. Because there was now no point in staying in New Mexico, the remaining ten members of the Texas Eleven returned to Texas to vote in opposition to the bill.

Wisconsin (2011)
During the 2011 Wisconsin protests, fourteen Democratic members of the Wisconsin Senate went to Illinois in order to bust the necessary 20-member quorum. Democrats in the Indiana House of Representatives did the same in order to block another union-related bill, causing the legislative clock on the bill to expire. Traveling out of their state placed these legislators beyond the jurisdiction of state troopers who could compel them to return to the chamber.

Oregon (2019)
Beginning in May 2019, Republican state senators in Oregon made a series of walkouts in opposition to an emissions trading bill. On 20 June 2019, Gov. Kate Brown authorized the Oregon State Police to bring back the senators, who had left the Oregon State Capitol to bust the needed quorum. State Sen. Brian Boquist said that he told the state police superintendent to "send bachelors and come heavily armed. I'm not going to be a political prisoner in the state of Oregon. It's just that simple."

Texas (2021)
Democratic House Representatives in Texas fled the state on the 12th of July 2021 to block the passage of a bill that would change voting rules. At least 51 Democrats – the number needed to break quorum – left the state to Washington D.C. via plane. On 10 August 2021 the House authorised arrest warrants for the legislators breaking quorum. After 38 days quorum was regained when three Democrats, Garnet Coleman, Armando Walle and Ana Hernandez returned, though with Coleman providing quorum from home due to serious illness and Republican Steve Allison isolating in a side room of the chamber due to contracting COVID-19.

Disappearing quorum

The similar tactic of a disappearing quorum—refusing to vote although physically present on the floor or walking out before a vote–was used by the minority to block votes as a filibuster in the United States House of Representatives from 1842 (when a speaking time limit was introduced) until 1890, when Speaker Thomas Brackett Reed ordered that members who were present but abstaining would count for the purpose of a quorum.

See also
Quorum call
Minyan – the quorum of 10 Jews (traditionally, ten male adults, above the age of 13) necessary for Jewish communal prayer to be conducted
Quorum sensing in bacteria

References

External links

 

 
Political terminology
Parliamentary procedure
Majority

fi:Päätösvaltaisuus